Kachamangalam is a Village in  Budalur block, Thanjavur district in the Indian state of Tamil Nadu.

References

External links
 Kachamangalam Village Location in Wikimpia

Villages in Thanjavur district